The Market Building, on N. Washington St. in Clarkesville, Georgia, was built in 1935. It was listed on the National Register of Historic Places in 1982.

It was built as a Works Progress Administration project.

It has also been known as the Agriculture Building.  It is or was located just west of the town square.

It may no longer exist, because Google Streeview survey of Washington St. using November 2018 imagery does not seem to turn it up.

References

		
National Register of Historic Places in Habersham County, Georgia
Buildings and structures completed in 1935